Human Cannonball is the second and final album by the alternative rock group School of Fish, released in 1993 by Capitol Records.

Production
The album was produced by Matt Wallace. Frontmen and songwriters Josh Clayton-Felt and Michael Ward were joined by a new bassist and drummer for the recording of the album.

Promotion
"Take Me Anywhere" was released as a lead single and peaked at #5 on Billboard'''s Modern Rock Tracks chart. The single featured a non-album track "Unrecognizable". The band supported the album with a North American tour.

Critical receptionThe Kitchener-Waterloo Record called the album "melodic, harmonic rock with an extremely hard edge." The Toronto Star concluded that "Human Cannonball offers a leaner, fresher sound than the band's debut, with a concentration on feel instead of perfection." The Dallas Morning News wrote that the guitars "reign, at times engulfing singer-guitarist Josh Clayton-Felt's occasionally whiny vocals with little effort." The Los Angeles Daily News opined: "Caked with musical grunge, School of Fish's sophomore effort ... bridges the gap between melodiousness and guitar-driven chaos as well as any album since Nirvana's Nevermind''."

Track listing
All tracks written by Felt & Ward.
"Complicator"  – 3:07
"Take Me Anywhere"  – 4:44
"1/2 a Believer"  – 3:17
"Fountain"  – 6:14
"Fuzzed and Fading"  – 5:05
"Blackout"  – 3:29
"Everyword"  – 3:37
"Jump Off the World"  – 4:15
"Drop of Water"  – 3:50
"Drag"  – 5:20
"Stand in the Doorway"  – 3:16
"Kerosene"  – 6:17
"Lament"   – 2:37

Personnel

Josh Clayton-Felt - Guitar, Vocals
Michael Ward - Guitar, Vocals
John Pierce - Bass, Cello
Josh Freese - Drums, Dancing

Production
Tony Phillips - Engineer, Mixing

References

School of Fish albums
1993 albums
Capitol Records albums
Albums produced by Matt Wallace